Penicillium brevissimum is a fungus species of the genus of Penicillium which was isolated from Indian soils.

See also
List of Penicillium species

References

brevissimum
Fungi described in 1976